Ionuț Nedelcearu (born 25 April 1996) is a Romanian professional footballer who plays as a centre-back for Serie B club Palermo and the Romania national team.

Club career

Dinamo București
Nedelcearu joined the youth system of Dinamo București at the age of seven. After playing for the reserves, he made his first-team debut on 31 October 2013 in a Cupa României match against Chindia Târgoviște, aged 17. On 13 December that year, he recorded his first Liga I appearance in a 4–0 home victory over ACS Poli Timișoara.

Nedelcearu netted his first goal for the Alb-roșii in a 3–2 away win against Pandurii Târgu Jiu on 28 October 2015, a game where he also scored in his own net.

Ufa
On 15 February 2018, Nedelcearu signed a three-and-a-half-year contract with Russian Premier League side FC Ufa. In the summer of 2019, press reported that several teams showed interest in signing him, including Roma and Zenit Saint Petersburg.

AEK Athens
On 5 October 2020, Nedelcearu signed a four-year contract with Super League Greece club AEK Athens. On 1 November 2020, he scored his first goal, the equalizer of an eventual 2–1 home win against OFI.

Crotone
On 16 July 2021, he moved to Italian club Crotone on a three-year contract, for a fee of €1.2 million.

Palermo
On 27 July 2022, following Crotone's relegation to Serie C, Nedelcearu signed for Serie B club Palermo on a three-year deal. He made his debut with the rosanero in the 32nd finals of Coppa Italia against Torino.

International career
On 27 March 2018, Nedelcearu made his full debut for Romania after being brought on as an 83rd-minute substitute in a 1–0 win over Sweden.

Personal life 
Nedelcearu was born on 25 April, 1996, in Bucharest. Before leaving his country for Greece he attended at National University of Physical Education and Sport.

Like him also his family is dedicated to the world of sport: Nedelcearu's father, Marin, was also a professional footballer, having represented Victoria București, Farul Constanța, FC Brașov and Oțelul Galați; instead his mother, Geta, was a sprinter in young age.

On 12 December 2022, Nedelcearu's father died.

Career statistics

Club

International

Scores and results list Romania's goal tally first, score column indicates score after each Nedelcearu goal.

Honours
Dinamo București
Cupa României runner-up: 2015–16
Cupa Ligii: 2016–17

References

External links

1996 births
Living people
Footballers from Bucharest
Romanian footballers
Romania youth international footballers
Romania under-21 international footballers
Romania international footballers
Association football defenders
Liga I players
Liga II players
FC Dinamo București players
Russian Premier League players
Super League Greece players
Serie B players
FC Ufa players
AEK Athens F.C. players
Palermo F.C. players
F.C. Crotone players
Romanian expatriate footballers
Expatriate footballers in Russia
Expatriate footballers in Greece
Expatriate footballers in Italy
Romanian expatriate sportspeople in Russia
Romanian expatriate sportspeople in Greece
Romanian expatriate sportspeople in Italy